Frederick "Fred" Ernest Ehrsam III, is an American business executive and investor who is the co-founder and managing partner of cryptocurrency investment firm Paradigm. He is also the co-founder of cryptocurrency exchange Coinbase.

Education and early life 
Ehrsam was born on May 10, 1988 in Boston, growing up in Concord, Massachusetts. He played video games professionally in high school, and was an avid World of Warcraft player, which introduced him to the concept of in-game digital currencies.

In 2010, Ehrsam graduated with distinction from Duke University, earning a B.S. in computer science with a minor in economics. At Duke, he was a member of the Sigma Alpha Epsilon fraternity.

Career 
After graduating from Duke, Ehrsam became a foreign exchange trader at investment bank Goldman Sachs in New York. He learned about Bitcoin from a Georgetown University professor's paper, and began trading in his free time.

Coinbase

In 2012, Ehrsam and Brian Armstrong co-founded Coinbase in an apartment in San Francisco, as a way for cryptocurrency enthusiasts to trade bitcoins and other digital currencies. The two met on the Bitcoin subreddit forum. Ehrsam served as Coinbase's first President. Ehrsam reportedly reached out to his alma mater Duke to invest in Coinbase's 2015 Series C.  He increased Duke's initial investment a hundredfold. In January 2017, he announced he was leaving the company, but would remain on its board. He also reportedly still owned 8.9% of Coinbase stock as of April 2021, and was assigned to the company's audit committee before its April 2021 public offering.

Ehrsam was featured as one of the main protagonists in the 2020 novel "Kings of Crypto: One Startup's Quest to Take Cryptocurrency Out of Silicon Valley and Onto Wall Street".

Paradigm
In 2018, Ehrsam co-founded cryptocurrency investment firm Paradigm with former Sequoia Capital investor Matt Huang. They founded the company to invest in cryptocurrencies and the companies that focus on that market, and became the firm's managing partners. As of October 2020, the company had made 28 investments in cryptocurrency related companies.

On November 15th, 2021, Paradigm closed the largest-ever cryptocurrency venture capital fund at the time. The fund raised a total of $2.5 billion to invest in nascent cryptocurrency and Web3 projects.

Recognition
In 2013, Ehrsam was named to TIME Magazine's list of 30 People Under 30 Changing the World. 
In 2014, at age 25, Ehrsam was named to Forbes' 30 under 30 list.

See also 

 Brian Armstrong (businessman)
 Olaf Carlson-Wee
 Sam Bankman-Fried

References 

1988 births
Living people
Duke University alumni
Businesspeople from California
American software engineers
American billionaires
People associated with Bitcoin
Goldman Sachs people
21st-century American businesspeople
Businesspeople from Boston
People from Concord, Massachusetts